Mariya Zakharchenko (born February 16, 1995, Kyiv) is a 1-dan professional Go player from Ukraine. She was awarded professional status by Hanguk Kiwon in 2012.

Go career 
Mariya Zakharchenko began playing go in 2005, at the age of 9. She began to studying game in a Kyiv go club where she was coached by Yuri Plusch (5-dan). During a few years Mariya also participated in numerous Ukrainian, European and international amateur competitions.

By 2008 Zakharchenko had reached the rank of 4-dan and was subsequently invited by Mr Poong Jho Chun (9P) to study at a South Korean insei school for women, becoming a grade five insei by the end of the year. 

In 2009, Zakharchenko was promoted to a grade three insei after winning a series of games in promotional tournaments. In 2011, Zakharchenko ranked among the top 12 female players in South Korea In 2012, Zakharchenko reached the level of first-grade insei and was subsequently promoted to 1-dan professional by Hanguk Kiwon.

Mariya Zakharchenko went on to win 3 games out of her first 44 professional matches including:
 21 GS Каlteks  (2015.12.07)  —  Choi Won Young 7p.
 Yoru Monindjon (2014.07.03)  —  Diána Kőszegi 1p.

References

External links 
Korea Baduk Association profile (in Korean)

1995 births
Living people
Ukrainian Go players
Female Go players